is a train station in Gose, Nara Prefecture, Japan, administrated by West Japan Railway Company (JR-West).

Lines
  JR-West
  Wakayama Line
  Kintetsu Railway
  Yoshino Line

Layout 
Yoshinoguchi Station has a side platform and two island platforms serving five tracks on the ground.

Platforms

Surrounding Area

Connections
 Gose City Community Bus
 for Kintetsu Gose Station, and Kazenomori Tōge

References

External links
 Official website (JR-West) 
 

Railway stations in Japan opened in 1896
Railway stations in Nara Prefecture